Martha Stewart Weddings is an online weddings magazine published by Martha Stewart Living Omnimedia. Martha Stewart Weddings was launched as an annual publication in 1994, and was expanded to quarterly in 1999. It was the second magazine title published by Martha Stewart Living Omnimedia, and was primarily distributed through newsstands.

In November 2014 the magazine was licensed to Meredith Corporation for ten-year period. In 2018, the magazine moved online-only.

References

External links
Official website

Annual magazines published in the United States
Lifestyle magazines published in the United States
Online magazines published in the United States
Quarterly magazines published in the United States
Defunct magazines published in the United States
Magazines established in 1994
Magazines disestablished in 2018
Magazines published in New York City
Martha Stewart Living Omnimedia
Online magazines with defunct print editions
IAC (company)